Jack Diamond,  (April 9, 1909 – March 25, 2001) was a Canadian businessman and philanthropist.

Born in Lubience in Galicia, Diamond immigrated to Vancouver in 1927. He bought a butcher shop and later created British Columbia's largest meat packing firm, Pacific Meats. In 1963, Diamond sold Pacific Meats and formed West Coast Reduction, a tallow and feed company.

He was Chancellor of Simon Fraser University from 1975 until 1978. In 1979, he was made a Member of the Order of Canada.  He was promoted to Officer in 1980 and promoted to Companion in 2000. In 1991, Diamond was appointed to the Order of British Columbia.

At the age of 21, Diamond married Sadie Mandleman.  They had two sons, Charles and Gordon, and have six grandchildren, and 15 great grandchildren.

References

 
 Running Tough: The Story of Vancouver's Jack Diamond, by Gareth Sirotnik, 1988. Published by the Diamond Family

External links

1909 births
2001 deaths
Businesspeople from Vancouver
Canadian Horse Racing Hall of Fame inductees
Canadian university and college chancellors
Companions of the Order of Canada
Members of the Order of British Columbia
20th-century Canadian businesspeople
Polish emigrants to Canada